Peter Charles Southey (4 January 1962 – 28 December 1983) was an English professional footballer who played for Tottenham Hotspur.

Playing career
Southey joined Tottenham Hotspur as an apprentice in October 1979. The promising full back played one senior match for the Spurs in a league match versus Brighton & Hove Albion in September 1979. Southey died from leukemia in 1983.

References

1962 births
1983 deaths
People from Parsons Green
Footballers from the London Borough of Hammersmith and Fulham
English footballers
English Football League players
Tottenham Hotspur F.C. players
Deaths from leukemia
Association football fullbacks